Wright Township is a township in Wayne County, Iowa, USA.

History
Wright Township was named for Greenwood Wright, a pioneer settler.

References

Townships in Wayne County, Iowa
Townships in Iowa